Shakespeare Songs is a 1967 LP album of Elizabethan songs which is one of the most celebrated recordings of the countertenor Alfred Deller. Deller is accompanied by lutenist Desmond Dupré and the Deller Consort, Philip Todd and Max Worthley tenors, Maurice Bevan baritone.

The album includes both anonymous songs adapted by Shakespeare, such as the Willow song, and also songs written by composers following the celebrity of Shakespeare's plays, such as Thomas Morley's "It Was A Lover And His Lass" which is not known to have actually ever been performed in the play As You Like It.

Track list
	– Thomas Morley	"It Was A Lover And His Lass"	2:53 from As You Like It V, 3
	– John Wilson  	"Take, O Take Those Lips Away"	1:31 Measure for Measure, IV, 1
	– Thomas Morley	"O Mistress Mine"	1:21 Twelfth Night, II, 3
	– Thomas Weelkes	"Strike It Up, Tabor"	1:38 -
	– Anonymous	"Willow song"	4:53 Othello, IV, 3
	– Robert Johnson "Where The Bee Sucks"	1:20 The Tempest, VI, 1
	– Anonymous	"How Should I Your True Love Know?"	1:49 Hamlet IV, 5
	– Francis Cutting	"Walsingham variations"	2:57 instrumental
	– Anonymous	"We Be Soldiers Three"	1:56
	– Anonymous	"When Griping Griefs"	2:58 Romeo and Juliet, IV, 5
	– Robert Johnson  	"Full Fathom Five"	1:57 The Tempest, I, 2
	– Anonymous	"Caleno custure me"	3:10 Henry V (play), not sung but mentioned at IV, 4
	– Anonymous	"Then They For Sudden Joy Did Weep"	1:22 King Lear, I
	– Anonymous	"Bonny Sweet Robin"	0:44 instrumental
	– Anonymous	The Wind and the Rain "When that I was a little tiny boy"	2:27 Twelfth Night, V, 1
	– Anonymous	"Kemp's Jig"	0:50 instrumental
	– Anonymous	"Greensleeves"	3:22
	– Anonymous	"He That Will An Alehouse Keep"	0:57 from Ravenscroft's Melismas
	–William Byrd	"Non Nobis Domine"	1:18

References

1967 albums
1960s classical albums